Bambamarca is a town in Northern Peru, capital of the province Hualgayoc in the region Cajamarca.

Geography

Climate

References 

Populated places in the Cajamarca Region